Les Hauts de Forterre is a commune in the department of Yonne, central France, in the natural region of Forterre.

The municipality was established on 1 January 2017 by merger of the former communes of Taingy (the seat), Fontenailles and Molesmes.

See also 
Communes of the Yonne department

References 

Communes of Yonne